The Rock Boat is an annual rock music-themed "floating music festival at sea" aboard a cruise ship. It takes place in different locations each cruise, with several dozen bands performing in each cruise.

History and description
The Rock Boat concept was born in 2001 with a joint venture from Gainesville, Florida alternative rock band Sister Hazel and Atlanta, Georgia travel company Sixthman in a partial charter aboard the Carnival Jubilee. Sister Hazel was joined by the band Dexter Freebish and approximately 400 of their fans.  The bands performed once on the ship, which sailed from Tampa, Florida to Cozumel, Mexico.

The concept has grown to become an annual event.  Destinations have included locations such as Mexico, Nassau, Bahamas, Jamaica, and Turks and Caicos.  The event is always hosted by Sister Hazel and includes musicians from all over the nation.  Past performers include: Tonic, Red Wanting Blue, Carbon Leaf, Gaelic Storm, Collective Soul, Cowboy Mouth, Pat McGee Band, Zac Brown Band, Michael Tolcher, Vertical Horizon, David Ryan Harris, Ingram Hill, Better Than Ezra, Marc Broussard, Wideawake, Stephen Kellogg and the Sixers, and many more.  There are generally four or five performing stages constructed on the venue, and performances are scheduled from noon until 3 AM.  However, many bands have been known to continue performing well beyond their scheduled set times and often collaborate on stage with other artists until dawn.

The cruise has been described by Ken Block (lead singer and guitarist for Sister Hazel) as "Spring Break for people with jobs."

Event details

The Rock Boat XXIII
Ship: Norwegian Cruise Line Pearl
Sail Date: January 30th, 2024
Ports: Leaving from Miami, Florida to Great Stirrup Cay, Bahamas and Costa Maya, Mexico
Announced Artists: 

 Bowling For Soup
 The Commonheart
 Drivin' n Cryin'
 The Moon City Masters
 Fever Dolls
 Gable Price and Friends
 Gaelic Storm
 Hotel Fiction
 Jon Foreman of Switchfoot
 KT Tunstall
 Red Wanting Blue
 Sister Hazel
 The Struts
 Susto
 Young the Giant

The Rock Boat XXII
Ship: Norwegian Cruise Line Pearl
Sail Date: January 23, 2023
Ports: Leaving from Miami, Florida to Puerto Plata, Dominican Republic and Nassau, Bahamas
Performing Artists: 

 American Authors
 The Astronomers†
 The Beaches
 Brian Fechino
 Carbon Leaf
 Dan Rodriguez*
 Driveway
 Floorbird†
 Green Light Morning†
 The Heavy Hours
 Hero The Band
 Kristy Lee
 Lady Bri
 Lit
 Magic Giant
 Meaghan Farrell*
 Megan Slankard
 Mo Lowda & The Humble
 Mom Rock
 Needtobreathe
 Neon Trees
 Red Wanting Blue
 Sister Hazel
 Southern Avenue
 Van Bellman
 The Talbott Brothers
 Terminus Horns (floating artist)
 Trousdale
 Welshly Arms
 Yam Haus
 Zach Person

* stowaway artists
† soundcheck artist winners

The Rock Boat XXI
Ship: Norwegian Cruise Line Gem
Sail Date: November 7, 2021
Ports: Leaving from Miami, Florida to Great Stirrup Cay, Bahamas and Ocho Rios, Jamaica 
(Original sailing was postponed due to Covid-19)
(Original Sail Date: January 27, 2021)
(Original Destinations: Ocho Rios, Jamaica and Georgetown, Grand Cayman)
Performing Artists: 

 The Alternate Routes
 American Authors
 Andrew Leahey & The Homestead
 Andrew McMahon In The Wilderness 
 Animal Years
 Billy Pilgrim
 The Blue Stones
 Bowling For Soup
 Brian Fechino
 The Collection
 Dark Water
 Elevado *
 Jon Tyler Wiley & His Virginia Choir *
 Joshua & the Holy Rollers
 Kristian Bush
 Mayday Parade
 Meaghan Farrell
 Micky James
 Mom Rock
 The New Respects
 Nick Fradiani
 Night Without Cars
 Phillip-Michael Scales†
 Red Wanting Blue
 Sister Hazel
 Swimming With Bears
 Switchfoot
 The Trews
 Vertical Horizon
 Wildermiss†
 Will Hoge

Artists who were announced but withdrew for any reason:

 Caroline Rose
 Hero The Band
 Lady Bri
 The Last Internationale
 The National Parks†
 Southern Avenue
 Welshly Arms
 We The Kings
 Yam Haus

* stowaway artists
† soundcheck artist winners

The Rock Boat XX
Ship: Norwegian Cruise Line Pearl
Sail Date: January 24, 2020
Ports: Leaving from Miami, Florida to Harvest Caye, Belize and Roatán, Honduras
Performing Artists: 

 Allen Mack Myers Moore
 The Alternate Routes
 Amy Gerhartz
 Animal Years
 The Bones of J.R. Jones
 Brett Newski & The No Tomorrow
 The Brevet
 Brian Fechino
 Carbon Leaf
 Carly Burruss
 Emily Wolfe
 Gaelic Storm
 Hero The Band
 J.R. Moore
 Lawrence
 Meaghan Farrell ‡
 Melodime
 Motherfolk$
 Needtobreathe
 Red Wanting Blue
 Sammy Rae & The Friends
 SCR
 Sister Hazel
 Stephen Kellogg*
 Switchfoot
 Tall Heights
 Tonic
 Tony Lucca
 The Unlikely Candidates$
 Welshly Arms
 The Whiskey Treaty Roadshow$
 Wideawake featuring The Kin†
 Will Hoge*

* stowaway artists
† The Kin departed early due to family bereavement 
‡ on board with Amy Gerhartz but did one solo show 
$ soundcheck artist winners

The Rock Boat XIX
Ship: Norwegian Cruise Line Pearl
Sail Date: February 1, 2019
Ports: Leaving from Tampa, Florida to Key West and Nassau, Bahamas
Performing Artists: 

 Alan Doyle
 Andrew Leahey & The Homestead‡
 Andrew McMahon In The Wilderness 
 Andy Frasco & The U.N.
 Andy Suzuki & The Method 
 Aslyn
 Atlas Genius 
 Brian Fechino
 Bronze Radio Return 
 Chris Ferrara & The Common Good
 Dan Rodriguez
 David Ryan Harris
 Hannah Wicklund & The Steppin Stones
 Harpoonist & The Axe Murderer
 Ian Moore 
 Katie Pruitt
 Kevin Devine
 Magic Giant
 Matt Nathanson
 The New Respects
 Plain White T’s 
 Red Wanting Blue 
 Sarah Potenza
 Simplified 
 Sister Hazel
 SCR‡
 The Talbott Brothers‡
 Tim Warren and Eric Donnelly*
 Trae Pierce And The T-stones
 Wild Adriatic
 Young Rising Sons† 

* stowaway artists
† dropped out  due to illness
‡ soundcheck artist winners

The Rock Boat XVIII
Ship: Norwegian Cruise Line Pearl
Sail Date: January 30, 2018
Ports: Leaving from New Orleans, Louisiana to Progreso, Mexico and Cozumel, Mexico
Performing Artists: 

 Alan Doyle
 The Alternate Routes
 Andy Frasco & The U.N.
 Barenaked Ladies
 Brian Fechino
 Choir! Choir! Choir!
 Christian Lopez
 Colony House
 Cowboy Mouth
 Danny Michel
 Dan Rodriguez†
 The Dead South
 Drew Holcomb and The Neighbors
 Elliott Brood
 The Georgia Flood
 JD Eicher*
 Kick The Robot
 Larkin Poe
 Low Cut Connie
 Melodime
 Needtobreathe
 The New Respects
 Noah Guthrie
 Oak & Ash†
 The Rocketboys
 Sam Burchfield
 Sarah Potenza
 Sister Hazel
 Stop Light Observations
 Tony Lucca*
 Waterdog
 Welshly Arms
 Wild Adriatic
 Will Hoge
 Wylder†

* stowaway artists
† soundcheck artist winners

The Rock Boat XVII
Ship: Norwegian Cruise Line Jade
Sail Date: February 10, 2017
Ports: Leaving from Tampa, Florida to Harvest Caye, Belize and Costa Maya, Mexico
Performing Artists: 

 All About A Bubble$
 Aijia*
 Amy Gerhartz
 Andy Grammer*
 Andy Frasco & The U.N.
 Andy Suzuki & The Method
 Ben Rector
 Better Than Ezra
 Brian Fechino
 Caleb Hawley$
 Carbon Leaf
 Connor Pledger
 The Currys$
 Dexter Freebish
 Firekid
 Francisco Vidal
 Gaelic Storm
 Green River Ordinance
 Grizfolk
 Harrow Fair
 Jared & The Mill
 JD Eicher
  Knox Hamilton
 Lovesweat
 Matt Nathanson‡
 Melodime
 Parachute
 Paul Pfau
 Red Wanting Blue
 Ripe
 Sarah Williams†
  Sasha Aaron
 Sister Hazel
 Stephen Kellogg & The South West North East
 Steve Everett
 The Trews
 Walk Off the Earth**
 Welshly Arms
 Wild Adriatic
 WRENN (AKA Pip The Pansy)

* married couple, dropped out due to pregnancy
** replaced Andy Grammer - but also dropped out due to pregnancy
† on board with Amy Gerhartz but did one solo show
‡ last minute replacement for Walk off the Earth
$ soundcheck artist winners

The Rock Boat XVI
Ship: Norwegian Cruise Line Pearl
Sail Date: January 26, 2016
Ports: Leaving from Miami, Florida to Costa Maya, Mexico and Grand Cayman
Performing Artists: 

 Air Traffic Controller†
 The Alternate Routes
 Andy Suzuki & The Method
 The Brevet†
 Brian Fechino
 Bronze Radio Return
 Colony House
 The Dusty 45s
 Emerson Hart
 Gavin DeGraw
 Hey Monea!
 Humming House
 JD Eicher & The Goodnights
 Kristy Lee & Dirt Road Revival
 Melodime
 Michael Franti & Spearhead
 Mike Mains & The Branches
 Needtobreathe
 Pat McGee
 Paul McDonald
 Radio Birds
 Red Wanting Blue
 The Rocketboys
 Sister Hazel
 Steve Everett
 The Trews
 Welshly Arms†
 Wild Adriatic
 Will Hoge

† soundcheck artist winners

The Rock Boat XV
Ship: Norwegian Cruise Line Pearl
Sail Date: January 24, 2015
Ports: Leaving from Miami, Florida to Cozumel, Mexico
Performing Artists: 

 Amy Gerhartz
 Andy Suzuki & The Method†
 Barenaked Ladies
 Brian Collins
 Brian Fechino
 Broken Anchor†
 Carbon Leaf
 Chuck Cannon
 Gaelic Storm
 Gareth Asher & The Earthlings†
 Green River Ordinance
 Hey Monea!
 Honor By August
 Kris Allen
 Melodime
 Michael Franti & Spearhead
 The Mowgli's
 Paul Pfau†
 Radio Birds
 Red Wanting Blue
 The Roosevelts
 Scars on 45
 The Shadowboxers
 Simplified
 Sister Hazel
 Steve Everett†
 Stokeswood
 Trailer Park Ninjas
 Vintage Blue†
 Von Grey
 Will Hoge

†soundcheck artist winners

The Rock Boat XIV
Ship: Norwegian Cruise Line Pearl
Sail Date: February 22, 2014
Ports: Leaving from Miami, Florida to Great Stirrup Cay, Bahamas
Performing Artists: 

 Alternate Routes
 Amy Gerhartz
 Besides Daniel
 Bronze Radio Return
 Collective Soul
 Courrier
 DJ Soulman
 The Dunwells
 Ed Kowalczyk formerly of Live
 Ed Roland & The Sweet Tea Project
 Erick Baker
 Gaelic Storm
 The Gallery
 JD Eicher
 Honor By August
 Edwin McCain
  Mark Kroos†
 Melodime
 Michael Bernard Fitzgerald
 The Mowgli's
 Native Run
 Radio Birds
 Radiolucent
 Reel Big Fish
 Red Wanting Blue
 The Roosevelts
 Scars on 45
 Scott Munns
 Sister Hazel
 Stephen Kellogg
 Taylor Carson
 Tonic
 Will Hoge
 Will Turpin

† not officially in the lineup but did one solo show

The Rock Boat XIII
Ship: Norwegian Cruise Line Pearl
Sail Date: February 24, 2013
Ports: Leaving from Miami, Florida to Great Stirrup Cay, Bahamas
Performing Artists: 

 Alternate Routes
 Joe Bachman
 Bronze Radio Return
 Carbon Leaf
 Brandi Carlile
 Roger Clyne and the Peacemakers
 The Daylights
 The Dunwells
 DJ Soulman
 Amy Gerhartz
 Good Old War
 Green River Ordinance
 Will Hoge
 Drew Holcomb and the Neighbors
 Ingram Hill
 Brendan James
 Jukebox The Ghost
 Junior Doctor
 Matthew Mayfield
 Jon McLaughlin
 Native Run
 NEEDTOBREATHE
  Ponderosa
 Ben Rector
 Red Wanting Blue
 A Rocket to the Moon
 Rusted Root
 Saints of Valory
 Satellites & Sirens
 Scars on 45
 Sister Hazel
 Stokeswood
 Swear and Shake
 Tony Lucca
 Trevor Jackson
 Yacht Rock Revue

The Rock Boat XII
Ship: Carnival Elation
Sail Date: March 1, 2012
Ports: Leaving from New Orleans, Louisiana to Cozumel, Mexico
Performing Artists:

 Alpha Rev
 Alternate Routes
 Atomic Tom
 Blackberry Smoke
 Tim Brantley
 Bronze Radio Return
 Marc Broussard
 Carbon Leaf
 Chamberlin
 The Damnwells
 Drew Holcomb and the Neighbors
 Dugas
 Ella Riot
 Jerad Finck
 Freddy Jones Band
 Hey Monea!
 Will Hoge
 Hornit
 Ingram Hill
 Brian Jarvis
 Kristy Lee
 Tony Lucca
 Kenny Mehler
 Red Wanting Blue
 Simplified
 Sister Hazel
 Stephen Kellogg and the Sixers
 Sunset Love Affair
 Thorny Rose
 Michael Tolcher 
  Trailer Park Ninjas
 Vertical Horizon

The Rock Boat XI
Ship: Carnival Inspiration
Sail Date: January 6, 2011
Ports: Leaving from Tampa, Florida to Costa Maya, Mexico (port unknown prior to sailing)
Performing Artists:

 Alternate Routes
 Antigone Rising
 Aslyn
 Tim Brantley
 Graham Colton
 Death on Two Wheels
 Matt Duke
 Elmwood
 Gaelic Storm
 Green River Ordinance
 Matt Hires
 Will Hoge
 Ingram Hill
 Junior Doctor
 Ed Kowalczyk
 Toby Lightman
 Tony Lucca
 M.E.R.M.E.R.
Scott Munns
 Nada Surf
 NEEDTOBREATHE
  Ponderosa
 Sam Thacker
 Sister Hazel
Trailer Park Ninjas
 Truth & Salvage Co.
 Matt Wertz

The Rock Boat X
Ship: Carnival Inspiration
Sail Date: January 7, 2010
Ports: Leaving from Tampa, Florida to Cozumel, Mexico
Performing Artists:

 Augustana
 B-Liminal
 Jim Bianco
 Blackberry Smoke
 The Bridges
 Marc Broussard
 Carbon Leaf
 Dexter Freebish
 Gaelic Storm
 Green River Ordinance
 Will Hoge
 Andrew Hoover
 Stephen Kellogg and the Sixers
 Tony Lucca
 Pat McGee
 Evan McHugh
 Scott Munns
 Oval Opus
 Sister Hazel
 Sun Domingo
 Michael Tolcher
 Francisco Vidal
 Tyrone Wells
 Wideawake
 Chelsea Williams

The Rock Boat IX
Ship: Carnival Destiny
Sail Date: January 17, 2009
Ports: Leaving from Miami, Florida to Nassau, Bahamas and Half Moon Cay
Performing Artists:

 Alternate Routes
 Aslyn
 Aural Pleasure
 The Benjy Davis Project
 Blackberry Smoke
 Carbon Leaf
 Graham Colton
 Cowboy Mouth
 Curtis Peoples
 David Ryan Harris
 Emerson Hart
 Ernie Halter
 Francisco Vidal
 Gaelic Storm
 Garrison Starr
 Graham Colton
 Green River Ordinance
 Hanson
 The Kin
 Michael Tolcher
 Sam Thacker
 Scott Munns
 Sister Hazel
 The Spring Standards
 Stephen Kellogg and the Sixers
 Tonic
 Trevor Hall
 Tyrone Wells
 Wideawake
 Zac Brown Band

The Rock Boat VIII
Ship: Carnival Imagination
Sail Date: January 19, 2008
Ports: Leaving from Miami, Florida to Ocho Rios, Jamaica and Georgetown, Grand Cayman 
Performing Artists:

 Alternate Routes
 Gareth Asher *
 Aslyn
 Marc Broussard
 Andy Davis
 Brett Dennen
 The Dewayn Brothers *
 The Edison Project
 David Ryan Harris
 Emerson Hart
 Georgia (band) *
 Amy Gerhartz *
 Keith Kane
 Stephen Kellogg and the Sixers
 Josh Kelley
 Bain Mattox
 Jon McLaughlin
 Matt Nathanson
 Oakhurst
 Pat McGee Band
 Gary Pfaff (now Gary Ray Pfaff)
 Glen Phillips
 Scarlet Kings (AKA Oval Opus)
 Keaton Simons
 Sister Hazel
 Sons of William
 Stroke 9
 Toad The Wet Sprocket
 Kate Voegele
 Yo Mama's Big Fat Booty Band
 Zac Brown Band

* Un-announced artists who played at least one show

The Rock Boat VII
Ship: Carnival Legend
Sail Date: January 11, 2007
Ports: Leaving from Fort Lauderdale, Florida to Grand Turk, Turks and Caicos
Performing Artists:

 Aslyn
 Better Than Ezra
 Scott Blasey
 Ken Block
 Carbon Leaf
 The Clarks
 Collective Soul
 Drew Copeland
 Cowboy Mouth
 Dead Confederate
 Stef Dorfman
 Five Star Iris
 Florez
 Gaelic Storm
 Getaway Car
 John Thomas Griffith
 David Ryan Harris
 Emerson Hart
 Ingram Hill
 Honor By August
 Christopher Jak
 Greg Joseph
 Keith Kane
 Josh Kelley
 Fred LeBlanc
 Toby Lightman
 Heather Luttrell
 Scott Munns
 Oval Opus
 Pat McGee Band
 Ed Roland
 Paul Sanchez
 Sister Hazel
 Sons of William
 Sonya Tetlow
 Sam Thacker
 Alex Woodard
 Claire Wyndham
 Francisco Vidal
 Wideawake
 Alan Yates
 Zac Brown Band

The Rock Boat VI
Ship: Carnival Elation
Sail Date: January 14, 2006
Ports: Leaving from Galveston, Texas to Playa del Carmen and Progresso, Mexico 
Originally scheduled to leave from the Port of New Orleans
Performing Artists:

 Shawn Allen
 Aslyn
 Dave Barnes
 Better Than Ezra
 Ken Block
 Blue Merle
 Marc Broussard
 Carbon Leaf
 Drew Copeland
 Danielia Cotton
 Stef Dorfman
 Evenout
 Five Star Iris
 Florez
 Dexter Freebish
 Gaelic Storm
 Getaway Car
 Pat Green
 David Ryan Harris
 Ari Hest
 Jon Hopkins
 Mat Kearney
 Josh Kelley
 Fred LeBlanc
 Shawn Mullins
 Scott Munns
 Pat McGee Band
 Glen Phillips
 Adam Richman
 Jackson Rohm
 Martin Sexton
 Sister Hazel
 Sovus Radio
 Michael Tolcher
 Francisco Vidal
 Virginia Coalition
 Django Walker
 Matt Wertz
 Wideawake
 Zac Brown Band

The Rock Boat V
Canceled due to Hurricane Katrina*
Ship: Carnival Sensation
Scheduled Performers:

 Theresa Andersson
 Sara Bareilles
 Dave Barnes
 Marc Broussard
 The Clarks
 John Corbitt
 Cowboy Mouth
 Gavin DeGraw
 Dexter Freebish
 Gaelic Storm
 David Ryan Harris
 Emerson Hart
 Ari Hest
 Ingram Hill
 Will Hoge
 Toby Lightman
 Matt Nathanson
 O.A.R.
 Doug Ray
 Sister Hazel
 Stroke 9
 Michael Tolcher
 Matt Wertz
 Wideawake
 Alex Woodard

* Guests and artists were invited to Atlanta during the weekend they were supposed to be on the cruise. Around 500 guests and most of the scheduled bands attended the shows, dubbed "Rock For Relief", raising $55,000 for Hurricane Katrina Relief.

The Rock Boat IV
Ship: Carnival Imagination
Sail Date: October 7, 2004
Ports: Leaving from Miami, Florida to Cozumel, Mexico
Performing Artists:

 Dave Barnes
 Ken Block
 Marc Broussard
 Chuck Carrier
 The Clarks
 Cowboy Mouth
 Gavin DeGraw
 Evenout
 Free Sol
 Dexter Freebish
 Gaelic Storm
 Emerson Hart
 Hello Dave
 Ingram Hill
 Will Hoge
 Wes Hutchinson
 Stephen Kellogg
 Shawn Mullins
  Scott Munns
 New Monsoon
 Pat McGee Band
 Pomeroy
 Jackson Rohm
 Peter Searcy
 Sister Hazel
 Sam Thacker
 Tonic
 Michael Tolcher
 Virginia Coalition
 Francisco Vidal
 Zac Brown Band

The Rock Boat III
Ship: Carnival Sensation
Sail Date: August 28, 2003
Ports: Leaving from Tampa, Florida to Cozumel, Mexico
Performing Artists:

 Shawn Allen
 Angie Aparo
 Ken Block
 Chuck Carrier
 Cowboy Mouth
 Dave Matthews Cover Band
 Wes Dearth
 Fighting Gravity
 Dexter Freebish
 John Thomas Griffith
 David Ryan Harris
 Ingram Hill
 Courtney Jaye
 Stephen Kellogg
 Fred LeBlanc
 Todd Martin
 Bain Mattox
 Edwin McCain
 Scott Munns
 Pat McGee Band
 Mieka Pauley
 Cary Pierce
 The Rising
 Jackson Rohm
 Pete Schmidt
 Tia Sillers & Mark Selby
 Sister Hazel
 Soul Phood
 Teitur
 Angela Todd
 Michael Tolcher
 Tonic
 Brian Vander Ark
 Francisco Vidal
 Virginia Coalition
 Alex Woodard
 Alan Yates

The Rock Boat II
Ship: Carnival Sensation
Sail Date: August 29, 2002
Ports: Leaving from Tampa, Florida to Key West, Florida and Nassau, Bahamas
Performing Artists:

 Chuck Carrier
 Cowboy Mouth
 David Ryan Harris
 Mimi Holland
 Dexter Freebish
 Courtney Jaye
 Chrystina Lloree
 Marathon
 Bain Mattox
 Edwin McCain
 Pat McGee Band
 Cary Pierce
 Quick Shot Paulo
 The Rugs
 Sister Hazel
 Six Against Seven
 Francisco Vidal
 Alex Woodard

The Rock Boat I (officially called Rock 'N Roll At Sea)
Ship: Carnival Jubilee
Sail Date: August 30, 2001
Ports: Leaving from Tampa, Florida to Key West, Florida and Cozumel, Mexico
Performing Artists:
 Dexter Freebish
 Sister Hazel

References

External links

Festivals in Cozumel
Music festivals staged internationally
Pop music festivals
Jam band festivals
Punk rock festivals
Rock Boat
Rock festivals in Mexico
Folk festivals in Mexico
Rock festivals in Jamaica
Music festivals established in 2001
Music cruises
Rock festivals in the Turks and Caicos Islands
Arts festivals in the Turks and Caicos Islands
Rock festivals in the Cayman Islands
Folk festivals in the Cayman Islands